Moojen's Atlantic spiny-rat, (Trinomys moojeni) is a spiny rat species from South America. It is found in Brazil. It is named after twentieth-century Brazilian zoologist João Moojen.

References

Trinomys
Mammals described in 1992